The Women's Initiatives for Gender Justice (WIGJ) is an international women's rights organisation that supports legal actions against gender violence through the International Criminal Court (ICC) and peace processes.

Aims
Women's Initiatives for Gender Justice, based in The Hague, describes itself as networking with "more than 6,000 grassroots partners, associates and members across multiple armed conflicts", especially conflicts under investigation by the ICC, especially in Uganda and the Democratic Republic of the Congo. WIGJ's networking includes participation in Sudan, the Central African Republic, Kenya, Libya and Kyrgyzstan. WIGJ also has offices in Cairo, Kampala and Kitgum.

ICC support
In September 2019, Melinda Reed of WIGJ commented on the decision by ICC judges to proceed to trial against al-Hassan Ag Abdoul Aziz, a Malian accused of crimes against humanity and war crimes during his role as head of the religious police in Timbuctoo during the Northern Mali conflict in 2012 and 2013. The case against al-Hassan explicitly includes systematic sexual slavery of Timbuctoo women and girls. The Guardian described the case as "groundbreaking" while Reed described the case as "another step in a positive evolution. Every decision matters. We are writing the jurisprudence of the future now, so every case and every step is extremely important with regards to gender-based and sexual crimes."

References

Gender equality
Women's rights organizations